Leslie "Les" Francis (born 25 May 1956) is a former South African professional darts player who used to play in the Professional Darts Corporation events.

Career
Born in Gauteng, Francis competed in the singles tournament of the 2005 WDF World Cup where he lost to Markus Korhonen in the first round.

Francis competed in the 2008 and 2009 South African Masters. He didn't manage to get through the first round at both editions, he lost to James Wade and Mervyn King respectively. Later in 2009, he threw a nine-darter.

He qualified for the 2010 PDC World Darts Championship after beating Devon Petersen in the final of the South African qualifying event. He played against Ireland's Aodhagan O'Neill in the preliminary round and lost 4-2 in legs.

Francis also worked as the director of the Gauteng Sports Council and president of the Gauteng Darts Association.

World Championship results

PDC
 2010: Last 72: (lost to Aodhagan O'Neill 2–4) (legs)

References

External links
 Darts Database Profile
 Mastercaller Profile

1956 births
Living people
Professional Darts Corporation associate players
South African darts players
South African sportsmen